Sainte-Rose (electoral district) re-directs here. For the provincial electoral district, see Sainte-Rose (provincial electoral district)

Marc-Aurèle-Fortin is a federal electoral district in Quebec, Canada, that has been represented in the House of Commons of Canada since 2004.

Geography
The district includes the neighbourhoods of Auteuil and Sainte-Rose, the eastern part of the neighbourhood of Fabreville, and the western part of neighbourhood of Vimont in the City of Laval. The neighbouring ridings are Rivière-des-Mille-Îles, Argenteuil—Papineau—Mirabel, Terrebonne—Blainville, Alfred-Pellan, and Vimy.

History
The district was created in 2004 from Laval Centre, Terrebonne—Blainville, Laval East and Rivière-des-Milles-Îles ridings. It is named in honour of the artist Marc-Aurèle Fortin.

This riding was significantly changed during the 2012 electoral redistribution. It lost territory to Thérèse-De Blainville and Rivière-des-Mille-Îles, and gained territory from Laval, Laval—Les Îles and Alfred-Pellan making the riding entirely within the city of Laval.

Members of Parliament

This riding has elected the following Members of Parliament:

Election results

See also
 List of Canadian federal electoral districts
 Past Canadian electoral districts

References

Campaign expense data from Elections Canada
2011 Results from Elections Canada
Riding history from the Library of Parliament

Notes

Quebec federal electoral districts
Politics of Laval, Quebec
2004 establishments in Quebec